Rev. Thomas Huyck DCL (died 1575) was Chancellor of the Diocese of London for 13 years and one of the founding fellows of Jesus College, Oxford.

Life
Huyck was appointed as a Canon of St David's in 1551. He was also Rector of Buckland Dinham, Somerset from 1551 to 1554. He became an advocate at Doctor's Commons in 1554, the same year that he obtained his BCL and DCL degrees from Merton College, Oxford.  In 1561, he was appointed Chancellor of the Diocese of London, a position he held until 1574.  In 1571, Huyck was named in the charter granted by Queen Elizabeth I as one of the eight founding fellows of Jesus College, Oxford.

References
 

1575 deaths
Alumni of Merton College, Oxford
Fellows of Jesus College, Oxford
16th-century English Anglican priests
English lawyers
Year of birth unknown
Members of Doctors' Commons
16th-century English lawyers